The 2010–11 Creighton Bluejays men's basketball team represented Creighton University during the 2010–11 NCAA Division I men's basketball season. The Bluejays, led by first year head coach Greg McDermott, played their home games at the Qwest Center Omaha as members of the Missouri Valley Conference. They finished the season 23–16, 10–8 in MVC play and lost in the semifinals of the 2011 Missouri Valley Conference men's basketball tournament to Missouri State. They were invited to the 2011 College Basketball Invitational where they advanced to the best-of-three finals against Oregon and former head coach Dana Altman, losing the series in three games.

Offseason

Departures

2010 recruiting class

Roster

Schedule
 
|-
!colspan=9| Exhibition

|-
!colspan=9| Regular season

|-
!colspan=9| Missouri Valley Conference Basketball tournament

|-
!colspan=9| College Basketball Invitational

References

Creighton Bluejays
Creighton Bluejays men's basketball seasons
Creighton Bluejays
Blue
Blue